Jane Badler (born December 31, 1953) is an American-Australian actress and singer. She is known for her role as Diana, the main antagonist in NBC's science fiction series V between 1983 and 1985. Badler also appeared in ABC's version of V in 2011, again playing an alien named Diana, who this time is the mother of the series' chief antagonist, Anna. Badler has also become an established nightclub singer in Australia, where she lives, and has released three albums.

Early life and education 
Badler was born in Brooklyn, New York. Her family is Jewish. Badler spent her teen years in Great Neck, New York, moving to Manchester, New Hampshire, when she was in high school. When Badler was 18, her father and brother were killed in a plane crash.

Badler won the title Miss New Hampshire and competed at the 1973 Miss America Pageant. Subsequently, she enrolled at Northwestern University in Evanston, Illinois, to study drama.

Career

Film career 
Badler's first television role was Melinda Cramer Janssen on the American daytime soap opera One Life to Live, which she played from 1977 to 1981 and again in 1983. During her run, she also appeared in a 1979 episode of the primetime series Fantasy Island. Badler also starred on the daytime soap opera The Doctors as Natalie Bell from 1981 to 1982.

Badler then won her most prominent role, that of the villainous alien Diana in the NBC sci-fi miniseries V (1983). She reprised the role in the sequel miniseries V: The Final Battle (1984) and again on V: The Series, which ran for one season from 1984 to 1985.

Following V, Badler co-starred with José Ferrer in the made-for-TV supernatural thriller Covenant. The following year she guest-starred as Meredith Braxton throughout the 1986–87 season of the CBS primetime soap opera Falcon Crest. Her other guest appearances during the 1980s included Riptide, Hotel and Murder, She Wrote. In 1987, she played the role of Tania Winthrop in the short-lived action-adventure series The Highwayman. She then traveled to Australia to play agent Shannon Reed in the 1980s revival of Mission: Impossible, joining the series midway through its first season (replacing actress Terry Markwell, and her character of Casey Randall); then stayed with the series for its second season before it was cancelled in early 1990. After the series ended, Badler moved to Australia permanently and married businessman Stephen Hains. They have two sons, Sam and Harry. She later appeared in the role of Mrs Peacock on the Australian game show Cluedo from 1992 to 1993, and had a guest-starring role in Snowy River: The McGregor Saga in 1995.

In March 2010, Badler was cast as the villainous Diana Marshall in the Australian soap opera Neighbours. She had a four-month guest contract with the show.

A remake of V premiered in late 2009, and although this version did not include the character of Diana, the series' executive producer, Scott Peters, suggested that Badler and other stars from the original version may be offered guest roles as new characters. In August 2010, it was announced that Badler would be joining the series as a new version of Diana, the mother of the Visitors' evil leader Anna (Morena Baccarin). Badler appeared in nine of the second season's ten episodes, commencing in January 2011. In the second-season finale, her character was killed by Anna, and ABC decided to not renew the series for a third season.

In November 2020 Badler played Lauren Balmer in the horror film Surrogate. The film will be released internationally in September 2022.

Music and theatre career 
Already an able singer when she competed in the Miss New Hampshire and Miss America Pageants, Badler forged a career in cabaret and on the stage in the 2005 Magnormos production of archy & mehitabel, based on Don Marquis's books of poetry. She also appeared in Sextet, Big Hair in America, and with acclaimed Australian director Robert Chuter (who also directed two of her cabaret shows in 2000) she appeared in The Singing Forest, The Great Gatsby and her one-woman show Shakin' the Blues Away in which she also sang. Other productions in which she appeared for Magnormos included a concert of the musical Rebecca and OzMade Musicals.

Badler released her debut album (backed by the Melbourne-based band Sir) on June 1, 2008. Titled The Devil Has My Double, it is an autobiographical album which has been described as "a compulsive mix of fame, sex and solitude, set to a sweeping soundtrack of cold soul and passionate synthetics". As part of promotion for the album, she gave an extensive interview about her work to the Boxcutters podcast.

Badler released her second album, Tears Again, in 2011. She then teamed up with Australian musicians Matt Doll and Byron St John to co-write her third album, Opus, which was released in September 2014.

Personal life
Badler married Australian businessman Stephen Hains in 1990. The couple met while she was filming Mission Impossible in Australia. Badler remained in Australia and the couple reside in Melbourne. They have two children.

On January 7, 2020, Badler announced that her 27-year-old son, actor Harry Hains, died of a fentanyl overdose following a battle with “mental illness, chronic sleeping disorders, and addiction".

Filmography

Discography

Studio albums

Singles

References

External links 
 
 
 
 
 Jane Badler interview with Rockwired
 Jane Badler interviewed on Boxcutters podcast

1953 births
Living people
20th-century American actresses
21st-century American actresses
Actresses from New York City
Actresses from New Hampshire
American beauty pageant winners
American expatriates in Australia
American women pop singers
American film actresses
American soap opera actresses
American television actresses
Manchester Central High School alumni
Miss America 1970s delegates
Musicians from Brooklyn
People from Great Neck, New York
Northwestern University School of Communication alumni
Nightclub performers
21st-century American women singers
Jewish American actresses
Jewish women singers
21st-century American Jews